John Whaley may refer to:
John Corey Whaley, American author
John Whaley (MP), MP for New Shoreham
John Whaley (fl. 1841), High Sheriff of Armagh

See also
 John Whalley (disambiguation)